Bishop Creek may refer to:

Bishop Creek, former name of Bishop, California
Bishop Creek (Inyo County) in Inyo County, California
Bishop Creek (Mariposa County, California) 
Baxter Creek in Contra Costa County, California
Bishop Creek (Forest Creek tributary), a stream in Oregon

See also
Bishop Branch